Caves are an English melodic punk band from Bristol. The lineup is based around the core duo of Lou Hanman (vocals/guitarist) and Jonathan Minto (bass/vocals). They have released albums on Specialist Subject Records, Yo-Yo Records, and Dead Broke Records.

History
Caves was formed by Lou Hanman (previously of Flamingo 50) after moving from Liverpool to Bristol, where Hanman met original drummer Dave Brent. After an initial lineup with Dave Brent's house mate Michael on bass, Jonathan Minto joined in 2010.

They played Florida Punk festival The Fest for the first time in 2010 (the first of three years in a row). The same year they released their debut self-titled EP, and a four-way split 10-inch with Calvinball, Pure Graft, and Big City Plan. They recorded their debut album, Homeward Bound, in the beginning of 2011 and it was released in July of that year.

In 2013 they their second album, Betterment, which was released to acclaim that July.

In 2014 they released third album Leaving, just eight songs and a total runtime of less than 20 minutes. That year Hanman moved to Philadelphia. The band continued to write long distance, and in 2017 they released a fourth album, Always Why.

In late August and early September 2018 they supported Australian band Camp Cope on a partial UK and European tour.

Hanman has also played in Philadelphia based bands Worriers and Katie Ellen, as well as being an occasional touring bassist for Olympia, Washington band RVIVR. Minto plays in Bristol based bands Dogeyed and Hell Maybe.

Discography

Albums
Homeward Bound - Yo-Yo Records (EU) / Specialist Subject Records (UK), 12-inch LP, MP3, (2011)
Betterment - Yo-Yo Records (EU) / Specialist Subject Records (UK), 12-inch LP, MP3, (2013)
Leaving - Yo-Yo Records (EU) / Specialist Subject Records (UK), 12-inch LP, MP3, (2014)
Always Why - Yo-Yo Records (EU) / Specialist Subject Records (UK) / Dead Broke Records (USA), 12-inch LP, MP3, (2017)

EPs
Caves - Specialist Subject Records, 7-inch, MP3, (2010)

Split releases
Split With Calvinball, Pure Graft, and Big City Plan - Roidh, 10-inch EP, MP3, (2010)
Split With Sundials - Kiss of Death Records, 7-inch EP, MP3, (2011)

References

Underground punk scene in the United Kingdom
Musical groups established in 2009
English punk rock groups
Specialist Subject Records artists